Cycling competitions at the 1980 Summer Olympics were split into two categories: Road and Track. Six events were contested (all for men). All four events of the track cycling were held at the Velodrome of the Trade Unions Olympic Sports Centre (Krylatskoye district, Moscow). The 100 km team time trial event was held along the Moscow-Minsk highway. It started from 23rd kilometre off Moscow, had a turning point at 73.5 kilometre off Moscow and finished not far from the starting point. The individual road race event (14 laps, 189 kilometres total) was held at the Olympic Cycling Circuit of the Trade Unions Olympic Centre.

Women's cycling was not part of the programme for the last time, being introduced in 1984.

Medal summary

Road cycling

Track cycling

Participating nations
230 cyclists from 34 nations competed.

Medal table

References

 
1980
1980 Summer Olympics events
Cycle races in the Soviet Union
1980 in track cycling
1980 in road cycling
1980 in cycle racing